Acartauchenius mutabilis is a species of sheet weaver spider found in Algeria, Morocco and Tunisia. It was described by Jacques Denis in 1967.

References

Acartauchenius mutabilis. Animal Diversity Web. Retrieved 11 December 2017.

Linyphiidae
Spiders of North Africa
Spiders described in 1967